The Veterans Memorial Parkway (VMP, known as "Veterans" by locals) is a 13.4 kilometre (8.3 mi) expressway located in the Canadian province of Ontario. The expressway was previously known as King's Highway 100 from 1977 until 1993, and as Airport Road from 1977 to September 2006. It is currently an at-grade divided four-lane road located entirely within London. The parkway begins in the south as Wilton Grove Road and ends at Clarke Road, which it continues as northward.

Airport Road was built by the Ministry of Transportation and Communications, predecessor to the modern Ministry of Transportation (MTO) in the late 1970s to connect Highway 401 with London International Airport. It was widened to four lanes in 2005 and renamed as the Veterans Memorial Parkway in 2006. Extensions south and north were completed in 2017 and 2020, respectively. Long term plans for the route call for grade separated interchanges along its entire length to convert it to a freeway.

Route description 

The Veterans Memorial Parkway is a  municipal expressway located in the Canadian province of Ontario. It is maintained by and located entirely within the city of London. The parkway begins at Wilton Grove Road, immediately south of Highway401, and travels north to Clarke Road, which it continues as northwards.

The parkway begins as a divided two-lane road the progresses northward through farm fields for  before crossing over Highway401 at a partial cloverleaf interchange (Exit194). It widens to four lanes north of the interchange and travels through empty fields, with several new industrial developments dotting the landscape, including a Dr. Oetker pizza factory.
It intersects Bradley Avenue and Hamilton Road before crossing the South Thames River.

The Veterans Memorial Parkway curves slightly northwest as it intersects River Road and enters suburban London. It passes under the Canadian National Railway (CN) Dundas subdivision before intersecting Gore Road. Now surrounded by commercial developments, it intersects Tartan Drive and Trafalgar Street. It curves north, with subdivisions now bordering its western side, before intersecting Admiral Drive and later Dundas Street. The parkway swerves lightly east and crosses the CP rail Galt Subdivision.

Now within a light industrial area, the route intersects Page Street and Oxford Street East before curving northwest and crossing Pottersburg Creek.
The parkway meets the CN Strathroy Subdivision at an at-grade crossing before intersecting Huron Street. Returning to undeveloped land, the route swerves northwest before intersecting and becoming Clarke Road.

History 
London endured a long debate about in-city freeway connections through the city and west to Sarnia, through the 1960s.  Repeated debates moved the links into and out of the city limits, and considered numerous options that either cut through existing neighbourhoods or were routed further out from the city center.  The road would connect to Highway 401 in the south and join up with Highway 402 in the west. This plan, however, never came to fruition due to city council's reluctance to fund an urban freeway.  When city council became more united in opposition to Highway 402 being routed through London, the highway now known as Veterans Memorial Parkway was conceived by the Ontario government as a compromise: a spur highway that would run along the eastern parts of London. 

The City of London and the province decided that the proposed road would be constructed as a two-lane highway from Highway 401 north to Oxford Street. Designed as a super two, the design included a  right-of-way so that an additional carriageway could be built in the future. As well, the road would be designated as Highway100 and named Airport Road. The road featured traffic lights at intersections, with available land to build interchanges if warranted. Construction on Airport Road began in early 1975, with its official opening in 1977.

The London–Middlesex Act, passed December10, 1992, expanded the municipal boundaries of the City of London effective January1, 1993.
Consequently, the Ministry of Transportation transferred responsibility for Highway100 to the city several months later on June24.
In 1998, the road was extended further north from Oxford to Huron Street.

On April17, 2003, funding was announced as part of a joint venture between the City of London, the Government of Ontario, and the Government of Canada, to widen Airport Road from Highway401 to Oxford Street. Construction began in 2004, using the right-of-way to construct another carriageway separated by a grass median.
The completion of the project resulted in a four-lane, divided highway with room for future interchanges and overpasses, similar to that of the Hanlon Expressway. The widening was completed in 2005.

On October25, 2005, the London city council voted in favour of renaming Airport Road as the Veterans Memorial Parkway as a tribute to Canadian veterans.
This name change ceremoniously took place on September15, 2006.
The state of the parkway quickly drew the ire of locals and veterans, with one remarking that the weeds and litter were an "insult".
A C$1.5 million proposal for beautification, designed by local architect Ron Koudys, called for the planting of flowers within the median, and shrubs and trees along the outskirts of the road. However, due to lack of funding, it took until 2010 for the project to begin.
It included a large gateway monument which was installed on the northbound lanes near the Highway 401 interchange, greeting motorists entering the expressway,
planting trees along the entire length of the expressway,
and raising flagpoles in tribute to Canadian veterans.

The proposed extension included the reconstruction of the existing trumpet interchange with Highway401 into a partial cloverleaf.
Construction began on the extension in September 2016. The C$23.5 million project was completed on November10, 2017.
A northern extension, north and west from Huron Street to Clarke Road, was proposed in 2007.
On March11, 2020, construction began on the C$12 million extension, including a realignment of the entrance to the Fanshawe conservation area as well as Clarke Road.
It opened to traffic in late 2020.

Future 
Widening the road between Oxford Street and Huron Street / Robin's Hill Road is in the City of London short term transportation objectives.

The City of London conducted a long-term transportation corridor protection study in 2001 and noted that the Veterans Memorial Parkway (then Airport Road) would serve as the city's eastern expressway when the city reaches its projected full build-out potential.
In 2007, the City of London conducted an environmental assessment on potential interchange locations to be built along Veterans Memorial Parkway.
Long-term plans have called for Veterans Memorial Parkway to be included as the eastern leg of a future London Ring Road. These proposals have been discussed since the 1960s but have yet to gain traction due to the requirement of land outside the cities boundaries.
The eastern corridor for a ring road would use Veterans Memorial Parkway in the east, then continue north along Clarke Road. A western link would start at Highway 402 and head north between Westdel Bourne Road and Woodhull Road.
The northern corridor is a major stumbling block since the lands needed within the city limits have been developed. The only available route possible would be outside of the city in Middlesex Centre. Although talks continue between both municipalities, only the province can approve the plan.

Major intersections

References

External links

 Video of the Veterans Memorial Parkway between Highway 401 and Huron Street
 Highway 401 / Veterans Memorial Parkway Improvements

Roads in London, Ontario
Monuments and memorials in Ontario
Expressways in Canada